Héctor Vargas (born 15 March 1959) is an Argentinian football manager who has worked primarily in the Liga Nacional de Honduras and is currently manager of Real España.

Club career
As a player, Vargas started his career at Estudiantes, before having spells at Temperley, Gimnasia and in Colombia.

Managerial career
Vargas alo started his managerial career at Estudiantes, before moving to Honduras to take charge of Universidad in 1997. He then managed Vida, Universidad again, Platense and from 2007  Hispano. He returned at Platense in May 2009. In January 2012 he was appointed manager of Victoria, where he stayed until 4 December 2013 when he was appointed manager of C.D. Olimpia.
In 2017, he got sacked from Olimpia and was appointed as coach for C.D Marathón.

Personal life
Vargas is married to a Honduran woman and they have a daughter and a son.

Honours and awards

Club
C.D. Olimpia
Liga Profesional de Honduras: 2013–14 C, 2014–15 C, 2015–16 C
Honduran Cup: 2015
Honduran Supercup: 2016 I, 2016 II
C.D. Marathón
Liga Profesional de Honduras: 2017–18 C
Honduran Supercup: 2019

References

External links
 Vargas: “El afecto por mis hijos es igual al que siento por Honduras - La Prensa 

1959 births
Living people
Argentine footballers
Estudiantes de La Plata footballers
Club Atlético Temperley footballers
Club de Gimnasia y Esgrima La Plata footballers
Atlético Bucaramanga footballers
Argentine Primera División players
Argentine football managers
Estudiantes de La Plata managers
Platense F.C. managers
C.D. Olimpia managers
C.D. Marathón managers
Argentine expatriate football managers
Expatriate football managers in Honduras
Association football midfielders
People from Formosa Province